She Lives! is a 1973 made-for-television movie about a young couple, Andy and Pam (played by Desi Arnaz Jr. and Season Hubley).

She Lives! is the title of a novel by Paul G. Neimark, published in 1972, on which the television drama is based.

The final scene when Andy shouts out in the streets "She Lives!" was filmed in San Francisco at the corner of Divisadero St. and Vallejo St.

Plot
Andy and Pam meet after Andy places a singles ad in his college newspaper. Pam sees his ad and sends Andy a letter. In that letter she advises him to put a response to her letter in the Who's Next album at a local record store. He does and they meet. They are instantly attracted to each other and in the next scene they are living together. Andy has to overcome the objections of his father and brother (his mother having died a year earlier) and he and Pam get jobs and live in her studio apartment.

They are happy until Andy discovers a lump in Pam's neck. They go for tests and find out Pam has Hodgkin's Disease. They are devastated and Pam goes to a therapist to help cope with the sad news. Pam considers suicide, but Andy talks her out of it by convincing her that they will fight. They find a doctor who gives Pam experimental treatments that almost kill her. They travel to San Francisco to meet with another doctor. At first, he won't take Pam's case but eventually he is swayed by Andy's tearful appeal. He turns out to be the doctor who gets Pam's disease into remission.

As the young lovers run throughout the streets of San Francisco celebrating the news they come upon a group of girls playing hopscotch. Andy borrows the chalk from one of them and the girl tells him, "Okay, but don't break it." He responds, "I will never break anything as long as I live." He writes She Lives! in chalk and runs through the streets shouting it. He turns and there is Pam, the girl he loves. As the movie ends, Jim Croce's "Time in a Bottle" plays over the credits.

External links
 

1973 television films
1973 films
American drama television films
1973 drama films
1970s English-language films
Films directed by Stuart Hagmann
English-language drama films